John and Harriet McKenzie House is a historic home located at Oswego in Oswego County, New York.   It is a -story, rectangular frame residence with Greek Revival details.  Its owner John McKenzie was a former fugitive slave who built the house about 1847.  Two years later Nathan and Clarissa Green built their house next door.

It was listed on the National Register of Historic Places in 2001.

References

Houses on the National Register of Historic Places in New York (state)
Houses completed in 1847
Houses in Oswego County, New York
1847 establishments in New York (state)
National Register of Historic Places in Oswego County, New York